Itk is a framework for building mega-widgets using the Incr Tcl object system. Mega-widgets are high-level widgets like a  file browser or a  tab notebook that act like ordinary Tk widgets  but are constructed using Tk widgets as component parts, without having to write C code. In effect, a mega-widget looks and acts exactly like a Tk widget, but is considerably easier to implement.

See also 
 Tk
 Itcl
 Tcl

Scripting languages
Dynamic programming languages
Dynamically typed programming languages
Tcl programming language family
Tk (software)